Anindya (Rana) Sinha is an Indian primatologist. He is a professor at the National Institute of Advanced Studies (NIAS), India.

Early life
After obtaining an undergraduate degree in botany from the University of Calcutta in 1983, he went on to earn a postgraduate degree in the same university in 1985, specializing in cytogenetics.

Career
He is on the executive board of Nature Conservation Foundation, India. His research is mostly centered on the field of cognition and consciousness of bonnet macaque (Macaca radiata) but he also has been involved in many genetics projects on Indian primates. He is also involved with Biology Olympiad as the leader of the Indian team.

He is the son of the Indian director and film-maker, Tapan Sinha. and actress / singer Arundhati Devi. In 2009, he was chosen as a TED Fellow.

References

External links
Profile on the National Institute of Advanced Studies website

20th-century Indian botanists
Living people
University of Calcutta alumni
Bengali Hindus
Scientists from Kolkata
Scientists from Bangalore
People from New Alipore
Year of birth missing (living people)